Ihor Oleksandrovych Shvaika (born 25 February 1976 in Troyitskoye, Kalmykia) is a right-wing Ukrainian politician and a former Minister of Agrarian Policy and Food of Ukraine. Shvaika was elected to the 7th Ukrainian Verkhovna Rada during the 2012 parliamentary election as a member of the All-Ukrainian Union "Freedom" party.

Biography 
Born in the Russian Republic of Kalmykia east of Ukraine where he spent the first 2 years of his life, Shvaika grew up in the city of Lutuhyne, Luhansk Oblast after 1978. He graduated from school with honors and entered the National University “Yaroslav the Wise Law Academy of Ukraine” in Kharkiv to study law. During this time he already worked as a legal adviser to a number of private companies. He graduated with a law degree in 1998, and then joined a private law firm called "Terra" as "Deputy Director of Legal Affairs". During the following year he headed the law firm "Ilyashev and partners" and in 2000 he started his own law firm called "Zeus".

Politics 
In 2007 he became member (Shvaika IV) of the right wing All-Ukrainian Union "Freedom"; by February 2008 he led the Kharkiv regional chapter. In October 2010 he ran as a candidate for Mayor of Kharkiv, receiving 0.84% of the vote. During the parliamentary elections of Ukraine on 28 October 2012, he was elected to Parliament for "Freedom", which ranked at number eight. He became Deputy Chairman of the 17-member Committee on Rules, Ethics and Support to Work of the Verkhovna Rada of Ukraine.

In the Yatsenyuk Government that came to power on 27 February 2014, Shvaika was Minister of Agrarian Policy and Food of Ukraine.

In the October 2014 parliamentary election Shvaika was 11th on the election list of his party; since the party came 0,29% short to overcome the 5% threshold to win seats on the nationwide list he was not re-elected into parliament.

On 12 November 2014 he and his fellow two Svoboda ministers in the Yatsenyuk Government resigned (they became acting ministers till a new Government was formed).

Since September 2015 Shvaika is a suspect in the investigate of clashes outside the Verkhovna Rada on 31 August 2015. During these clashes between Ukrainian nationalists and security forces a member of the National Guard of Ukraine died after being hit with shrapnel, apparently from a hand grenade. Shvaika has been imprisoned and bailed out multiple times since.

In a 2019 Ukrainian parliamentary election by-election on 15 March 2020 Shvaika (for Freedom) failed to win a parliamentary seat in electoral district 179 located in Kharkiv Oblast because he gained only 2.19% or 853 of the votes.

Private life 
He has been married three times, and has one daughter and one son.

References

External links 
Official site

1976 births
Living people
People from Kalmykia
Svoboda (political party) politicians
Agriculture and food provision ministers of Ukraine
Seventh convocation members of the Verkhovna Rada
Ukrainian jurists
Yaroslav Mudryi National Law University alumni
Ukrainian nationalists